Come from Away is a Canadian musical, with book, music and lyrics by Irene Sankoff and David Hein. It is based on the events in the Newfoundland town of Gander during the week following the September 11 attacks, when 38 planes, carrying approximately 7,000 passengers, were ordered to land unexpectedly at Gander International Airport. The characters in the musical are based on (and in most cases share the names of) actual Gander residents and stranded travellers they housed and fed. The musical has been received by audiences and critics as a cathartic reminder of the capacity for human kindness in even the darkest of times and the triumph of humanity over hate.

After being workshopped in 2012 and first produced at Sheridan College in Oakville, Ontario, in 2013, it went on to have record-breaking runs at the La Jolla Playhouse in San Diego, California, and the Seattle Repertory Theatre in 2015, at the Ford's Theatre in Washington, D.C., and the Royal Alexandra Theatre in Toronto in 2016. It opened on Broadway at the Gerald Schoenfeld Theatre on March 12, 2017, and became a critical and box office success, routinely playing to standing-room-only audiences even during previews. In October 2018 it became the longest-running Canadian musical in Broadway history, surpassing The Drowsy Chaperone'''s previous record of 674 performances, and has since joined the list of Broadway shows with 1,000 or more performances. A live recording of the production was released on September 10, 2021, on the eve of the 20th anniversary of the attacks. On June 8, 2022, it was announced that the Broadway production would close on October 2 after having played 25 previews and 1,670 regular performances.

The musical premiered at The Abbey Theatre in Dublin, Ireland, in December 2018 and then transferred to the Phoenix Theatre in the West End in February 2019. On July 1, 2022, it was announced that the London production would close on January 7, 2023.

At the 71st Tony Awards in 2017, the musical was nominated for seven awards, including Best Musical, Best Original Score, Best Book of a Musical and Best Featured Actress in a Musical for Jenn Colella, winning for Best Direction of a Musical for Christopher Ashley.

Inception and development
The show was conceived by Michael Rubinoff, a Toronto lawyer, theatre producer, and Associate Dean of Visual and Performing Arts at Sheridan College in Oakville. After approaching various writing teams about the project, Rubinoff attracted Irene Sankoff and David Hein, whose work he knew from their 2009 musical My Mother's Lesbian Jewish Wiccan Wedding, which was a hit at the Toronto Fringe Festival and later picked up by Mirvish Productions.

In 2011, Sankoff and Hein visited Gander on the tenth anniversary of the attacks to interview locals and returning passengers. The couple translated some stories directly to the musical while others were merged for story purposes. Rubinoff used their initial script to produce a 45-minute workshop version for the Canadian Music Theatre Project, part of the Sheridan College Music Theatre Performance Program, in 2012. The workshop was sufficiently successful that Rubinoff invited Sankoff and Hein to finish writing it for a full production at Sheridan in 2013, as part of the college's regular theatrical season. The full production, directed by Brian Hill, was an artistic success, but Rubinoff was unable to attract a Canadian producer for further development.

In the meantime, Goodspeed Musicals of East Haddam, Connecticut, included the show in its workshop program. The National Alliance for Musical Theatre in New York selected it as a showcase presentation in fall 2013, where a performance, also directed by Brian Hill, led to the show being optioned by Junkyard Dog Productions, the production company behind Memphis and First Date.

Synopsis
On the morning of September 11, 2001, the townsfolk of Gander (including Claude the mayor, Oz the police constable, Beulah the teacher, Bonnie the SPCA worker and others) describe life in Newfoundland and how they learn of the terrorist attacks taking place in New York City, Washington, D.C., and Shanksville, Pennsylvania ("Welcome to the Rock").

The attacks result in US airspace being closed, forcing 38 international aircraft to be diverted and land unexpectedly at the Gander airport, doubling the population of the small Newfoundland town, which is unequipped for the influx of stranded travellers ("38 Planes"). The Gander townspeople spring to action and prepare to house, feed, clothe, and comfort the nearly 7,000 passengers (along with 19 animals in cargo) ("Blankets and Bedding"). Meanwhile, the pilots, flight attendants and passengers are initially not permitted to leave the planes, forcing them to deal with confusing and conflicting information about what has happened and why they were suddenly grounded ("28 Hours / Wherever We Are").

Once allowed off the planes and transferred to various emergency shelters in and around Gander ("Darkness and Trees"), the passengers and crew watch replays of the attacks on the news and learn the true reason why they were grounded ("Lead Us Out of the Night"). The frightened and lonely passengers desperately try to contact their families and pray for their loved ones, while the townsfolk work through the night to help them in any and every way they can ("Phoning Home / Costume Party"). The travellers are initially taken aback by their hosts' uncommon hospitality, but they slowly let their guards down and begin to bond with the quirky townsfolk and each other. The "islanders" in Gander and the surrounding towns open up their homes to the "plane people", regardless of their guests' race, nationality or sexual orientation.  Two women, Beulah (from Gander) and Hannah (from New York), bond over the fact that both of their sons are firefighters, but Hannah's son is missing ("I Am Here"). Hannah asks Beulah to take her to a Catholic church, and a number of characters make their way to other houses of worship around town ("Prayer").

To alleviate rising fear and mounting tensions ("On The Edge"), the passengers are invited to be initiated as honorary Newfoundlanders at the local bar ("Heave Away / Screech In"). The gravity of the attacks nevertheless continues to set in as US airspace is eventually reopened. One trailblazing pilot, Beverley Bass, comments on how her once optimistic view of the world has suddenly changed ("Me and the Sky"). While one pair of passengers starts to develop a romance despite the terrible thing that brought them together ("The Dover Fault/Stop the World"), another pair sees their long-term relationship fall apart under the stress of the event.

As the passengers and crew fly away to their homes, they joyously exchange stories of the immense kindness and generosity that was shown to them by the Newfoundland strangers in their time of need ("Somewhere in the Middle of Nowhere"), but not before a Muslim traveller, faced with increasing prejudice from his fellow passengers, undergoes a humiliating strip search prior to boarding. The townsfolk in Gander return to normal life, but comment on how empty their town now seems and how different the world now feels.  The passengers and airline staff who return to the United States are faced with the horror of the attacks' aftermath—including Hannah, who learns that her firefighter son died during the rescue efforts ("Something's Missing").

Ten years later, the crew and passengers (the "come from away") of the once stranded planes reunite in Gander, this time by choice, to celebrate the lifelong friendships and strong connections they formed in spite of the terrorist attacks ("Finale"). As Claude the mayor professes, "Tonight we honour what was lost, but we also commemorate what we found."

Characters and casts

Notable cast replacements
 Broadway
 Nick/Doug and others: Jim Walton (from 13 November 2018)
 Beverley and others: Becky Gulsvig (12 November 2019 to 1 March 2020)
 Beverley and others: Rachel Tucker (from 3 March 2020 to 18 September 2022)
 London
 Kevin T. and others: David Thaxton (from 9 September 2019)
 Beverley and others: Alice Fearn (from 10 February 2020)
 Kevin T. and others: Mark Dugdale (from 10 February 2020)

Musical numbers
  "Welcome to the Rock" – Claude, Company
  "38 Planes"† – Company
  "Blankets and Bedding" – Company
  "28 Hours / Wherever We Are" – Company
  "Darkness and Trees" – Company
  "On the Bus" – Company
  "Darkness and Trees (Reprise)"† – Company
  "Lead Us Out of the Night"† – Company
  "Phoning Home"† – Company
  "Costume Party" – Diane, Kevin T, Beverley, Hannah, Kevin J, Nick, Bob
  "I Am Here" – Hannah
  "Prayer" – Kevin T, Company
  "On the Edge" – Company
  "In the Bar/Heave Away"† – Company
  "Screech In" – Claude, Company
  "Me and the Sky" – Beverley, Female Ensemble
  "The Dover Fault" – Nick, Diane
  "Stop the World" – Nick, Diane, Company
  "38 Planes (Reprise) / Somewhere in the Middle of Nowhere" – Beverley, Company
  "Something's Missing" – Company
  "Finale" – Claude, Company
  "Screech Out"† – Band

†Not listed on the show's Playbill.

Productions

 Out-of-town tryouts (2015–2017) 
The first professional production was a collaboration by the La Jolla Playhouse and Seattle Repertory Theatre in 2015. The play had extended runs in each location. The musical opened at the La Jolla Playhouse in June 2015, directed by Christopher Ashley and featuring Joel Hatch as the Mayor of Gander, Jenn Colella as Beverley, and Chad Kimball as Kevin. In Seattle, it broke all box office records (including highest grossing show and largest single ticket sales day) at Seattle Repertory Theatre.

Following its runs in San Diego and Seattle, the show played out-of-town engagements at Ford's Theatre in Washington, D.C., from September 2, 2016, to October 9, 2016,Marks, Peter. "‘Come From Away’ stirs powerful memories of 9/11"  The Washington Post, September 8, 2016, and then at the Royal Alexandra Theatre in Toronto, Ontario, from November 15, 2016, to January 8, 2017. The entire run of the Toronto production sold out during its second week of performances. The show's ticket sales set a record for the then 109-year-old Royal Alex Theatre, selling $1.7 million in tickets in a single week. The show could not be extended due to its Broadway commitment but, as a result of the strong demand, Mirvish Productions announced on December 2, 2016, that it was adding an additional four box seats and 12 standing-room locations for the duration of the show. An additional show was also added on the evening of December 18, 2016.

 Broadway (2017–2022) 

The musical opened in previews on Broadway on February 18, 2017, and officially opened on March 12, 2017, at the Gerald Schoenfeld Theatre. The show has been playing to standing-room-only audiences. Direction is by Christopher Ashley, choreography by Kelly Devine, scenic design by Beowulf Boritt, costume design by Toni-Leslie James, lighting design by Howell Binkley, sound design by Gareth Owen, and music direction by Ian Eisendrath. The performance of March 15, 2017, on Broadway was attended by Prime Minister Justin Trudeau (who addressed the audience before the show), other current and former Canadian federal politicians and provincial politicians from Newfoundland and Labrador, US Ambassador to the United Nations Nikki Haley, and Ivanka Trump.

On March 12, 2020, the show suspended production due to the COVID-19 pandemic. On May 10, 2021, it was revealed that the show would be returning to Broadway on September 21. From June 21, 2022, until August 7, 2022, original cast member Jenn Colella briefly returned as Beverley/Annette & others. On June 8, 2022, it was announced that the Broadway production would close on October 2, 2022, after 25 previews and 1,670 regular performances, making it the 49th longest running show on Broadway.

 Canada (2018–2022) 
A second Canadian production opened in a sold-out, four-week run in Winnipeg at the Royal Manitoba Theatre Centre in January 2018. The production began performances at the Royal Alexandra Theatre in Toronto on February 13, 2018, and recouped its full capitalization in 14 weeks. Due to continued demand, the show transferred to the nearby Elgin Theatre on February 5, 2019, after ending its run at the Royal Alexandra Theatre on January 20, 2019. During the hiatus, the cast performed eight benefit concerts  of the show at the Holy Heart Theatre in St. John's, Newfoundland and Labrador. The net proceeds from the performances were donated to Gander, Gambo, Appleton, Lewisporte, Norris Arm, and Glenwood, the six towns that hosted the 7,000 travellers, along with the Autism Society of Newfoundland and Labrador and the Community Food Sharing Association. The production moved to the Elgin Theatre in order to accommodate the Canadian production of Dear Evan Hansen, which was promised the Royal Alexandra Theatre. On July 3, 2019, following the announced closure of Canadian production of Dear Evan Hansen, it was announced that Come from Away would transfer back to the Royal Alexandra Theatre on December 13, 2019. The production closed at the Elgin Theatre on December 1, 2019, in order to facilitate the move. After a 21-month pandemic hiatus beginning in March 2020, Come From Away reopened on December 15, 2021, but closed again on December 22. Although initially hoping to resume on December 28, on December 27 it was announced that Come From Away in Toronto was closed permanently.

In May 2021, it was announced that the Canadian Production of the musical would be on a limited run at Ottawa's Babs Asper Theatre in July 2024 before returning to Toronto's Royal Alexandra Theatre in September 2024.

 North American tour (2018) 
The musical started its North American tour of more than 50 cities in October 2018 at the 5th Avenue Theatre in Seattle, Washington.

 UK (2019–2023,2024-2025) 
The musical ran at the Abbey Theatre in Dublin, Ireland, from December 2018 to January 2019, before transferring to the Phoenix Theatre in London's West End from January 30, 2019, with a British cast. The West End production closed on January 7, 2023, after 1,048 performances. A UK touring production is planned to begin in March 2024. due to open at the curve theatre in leicester on 1st march 2023.

 Australia (2019–2023) 
An Australian production opened at the Comedy Theatre, Melbourne, in July 2019. The Australian Company was planned to tour China, but this was cancelled due to SARS-CoV-2. Although the initial Melbourne Fall Season was cut short due to SARS-CoV-2, a short encore in Melbourne in February 2021 occurred before briefly stopping at Queensland Performing Arts Centre in Brisbane before transferring to Capitol Theatre in Sydney. The Melbourne production became the Comedy Theatre's most successful musical in its history.  The production has since toured to the Gold Coast and Perth, with return seasons in Melbourne and Sydney.

 Europe 
The Nordic premiere of the musical took place on September 26, 2020, in Norrköping, Sweden, in a production by the East Gothland Theatre.

A Dutch production was announced on April 12, 2021, and starred Willemijn Verkaik as Beverley Bass.

 South America 
The Argentinian production was announced in April 2020 but postponed to April 2022 due the pandemic, at the Teatro Maipo in Buenos Aires, with Carla Calabrese as Director and a production by The Stage Company.

Critical reception
Seattle

Misha Berson, writing for the Seattle Times, praised Christopher Ashley's fluid staging, calling the show a "meaningful balm to the benumbed psyche."  Berson closed the review noting how the show "honors our capacity for humble goodness and mutual empathy in the shadow of faith-shattering evil."

Jay Irwin with Broadway World called the production "emotionally transcendent" and "the best musical I've seen all year and possibly ever."

Washington, DC

David Gerson with DC Metro Theatre Arts called the show "one of the most refreshing pieces of art that I have seen in years. The folk and country influenced pop score is tuneful and the cast sings the hell out of it." Peter Marks, in his review in The Washington Post, noted that the musical "stirs powerful memories of 9/11 ... if the book's mechanics unfold with too much sugar, the score has an infectious, gritty vitality: Especially good is a number set in a Gander pub, choreographed by Kelly Devine, during which a risibly nutty local initiation rite is performed, involving the embrace of a recently caught codfish."

Toronto

Kelly Nestruck of The Globe and Mail wrote that "the heartwarming musical lives up to the hype" and that "the accessible story, strong emotional core and gorgeous songwriting should not distract from how original and smart this gem of a musical is." Robert Cushman of the National Post called the production "outstanding." Liz Braun of the Toronto Sun gave the show a perfect 5-star review, writing "Blame Canada: a grim day in American history has been transformed into a joyous and emotional musical about the indomitable human spirit." Alan Henry of Broadway World said "You'll laugh, you'll cry, and you'll be a better person when you leave the theatre. Don't miss 'Come From Away'."

Broadway
Ben Brantley, chief theatre critic for The New York Times, wrote "Try, if you must, to resist the gale of good will that blows out of 'Come From Away,' the big bearhug of a musical that opened on Sunday night at the Gerald Schoenfeld Theater. But even the most stalwart cynics may have trouble staying dry-eyed during this portrait of heroic hospitality under extraordinary pressure." He awarded the show the Critics' Pick designation, given to productions the critic believes have particular merit. Joe Dziemianowicz of the New York Daily News called the show "big-hearted and crowd-pleasing" and "a singing reminder that when things are at their worst, people can be at their best." Joe Westerfield with Newsweek wrote that "'Come From Away' accomplishes what all the best musicals do: It takes you to a place where you didn't know you wanted to go, and makes you not want to leave." Frank Scheck of The Hollywood Reporter called the musical "heartwarming and thoroughly entertaining ... especially in these politically fractious times." Johnny Oleksinski with the New York Post wrote that "Every New Yorker must see this show", referring to the musical as "Broadway's biggest and best surprise of the season." Peter Marks of The Washington Post called the show "an effervescent musical" and "an antidote for what ails the American soul." Michael Dale of Broadway World called the show an "inspiring, funny and kick-ass beautiful new musical" and went on to say that "as long as 'Come From Away' is playing on Broadway, I will recommend it to everyone. Everyone." Steven Suskin, drama critic for The Huffington Post, wrote that "'Come From Away' is altogether different and altogether gripping, ... brave and new and unusual and overwhelmingly heart-tugging." Robert Kahn with NBC called the piece "a dignified, often funny new musical" which "find[s] a spiritual angle to a horrific story, depicting the goodness in humanity while still allowing us room for the feelings of loneliness and fear that will always be connected to that time." Jennifer Vanasco with WNYC called the show "a love letter – to Newfoundland, to New York, to what people can do if they set aside fear and hate. Don't miss it."

Recording
An original Broadway cast recording was released on March 10, 2017, through Molly Records. It peaked at number 92 on the Top Current Albums chart and number two on the Cast Albums chart.

Awards and honors
Original Washington, D.C. production

 Original Broadway production 

 Original West End production 

Adaptations
Theatrical film
In November 2017, it was announced that The Mark Gordon Company would produce a feature film adaptation of the musical, with Sankoff and Hein writing the screenplay and Christopher Ashley as director. In April 2019, Sankoff and Hein stated that the intention was to shoot in Gander and cast lesser-known actors, with Gander residents as extras.

Filmed stage production

In February 2021, it was announced that, due to the COVID-19 pandemic and its impacts on the film industry and the performing arts, the film adaptation was cancelled in favor of producing a live recording of the stage production with the members of the Broadway cast reprising their roles, to be released in September 2021 on the 20th anniversary of the attacks. Produced and financed by Entertainment One and RadicalMedia, a May 2021 staging at the Gerald Schoenfeld Theater with Ashley directing and Gordon as producer was used. Joining the producing team are Jennifer Todd, Bill Condon and one of the stage production's producers, Junkyard Dog Productions. Sankoff, Hein, Jon Kamen, Dave Sirulnick and Meredith Bennett executive produced. The film employed 222 people, including the members of the New York cast, crew, staff, and creative and film teams. In April 2021, Apple TV+ acquired the film's distribution rights. It was released on September 10, 2021.

See alsoDivertedYou Are Here''

References

External links
 
 
  (archive)

2013 musicals
Aviation musicals
Broadway musicals
Canadian musicals
Gander, Newfoundland and Labrador
LGBT-related musicals
Music about the September 11 attacks
Songs based on Canadian history
Musicals inspired by real-life events
Newfoundland and Labrador in fiction
Works about Canada–United States relations
One-act musicals
Plays about the September 11 attacks
Plays set in Canada
Tony Award-winning musicals
Plays set in the 21st century
Sung-through musicals
Through-composed musicals